Trebol (foaled 2007) is a Spanish Menorcan Standardbred Trotter most famous for being the first Spanish bred Trotter to win an international Grade 1. Later in his career he stayed on the island of Menorca racing at their two major racetracks. there he'd set a world record for most consecutive wins by a Standardbred at 56.

Background 
Trebol's name means "clover" in Spanish and was born in Spain sometime in 2007. Specifically on the Spanish island of Menorca. Menorca has two harness tracks. Hipòdrom Municipal De Maó,and Hipódromo Torre Del Ram. These two tracks would be where he would start and end his decade long racing career.

Racing career 
Trebol started his career in 2009 at the age of two with almost immediate success. For his first two years on the track he raced strictly in the Balearic Islands of Spain first at the two tracks in Menorca before then going to the two tracks in the nearby island of Mallorca. In total his first 23 starts all were in Spain with 17 wins as well as a 13 race winning streak. He won these races at distances as short as 1600m but as long as 2700m. But at the start of his 4-year-old season after winning one more race in Spain he was shipped over to France. There he was entered in the group 3 Prix Charles Tiercelin where he would come third,snapping his win streak. He wouldn't win in France that year but was able to add another 7 wins in Mallorca before a life-threatening bouts of colic sidelined him.

He would return to racing but instead of running in Spain he ran at multiple French tracks. It was harder to pick up wins in France then in Spain winning at most 2 races a year from 2012 to 2014 Despite winningway less he earned the majority of his earnings from his time outside of Spain. But he wouldn't get a true taste of success until 2015 when he was 8-years-old. Starting with a second in the Group 3 Prix Jean Rene Gougeon. But history was to be made when he shipped over to Finland for the Group 1 Kymi Grand Prix. There he would remain near the back of the pack during the first two laps. But when it came time for the third lap he made up ground passing horse after horse until he passed the leader Maven and held off a late charge from Oasis Bi. This win would mark the first time a Trotter bred in Spain had won an International Group 1 race.

He wasn't finished in 2016 when he repeated the feat the following year. Although it was closer with him only getting up in the final strides he still came out on top to win his second and final Group 1 race. Later that year he would add Group 3 Prix Luxembourg in France to his international resume with it being his biggest career win in France. He'd have one more year of international racing with no more wins but at the end of his 10-year-old season he was finally brought back to his home in Spain to race at Hippodrome San Pardo in Malorca. The race was 3150m or just under 2 miles and he won it easily. Originally it was meant to be his final career start. But it turned to be the first victory in his winning streak.

Winning Streak 
After his first win in his winning streak at San Pardo he finally returned to his birthplace on the island of Menorca. There he would alternate between Hipòdrom Municipal De Maó,and Hipódromo Torre Del Ram winning much smaller purses than up in France. He would also run much more frequently during this time winning all 28 starts in 2018 at the age of 11. At the start of his 12-year-old season was when the winning streak started to gain major attention as it started to approach the world record.

He had already easily beaten San Simeon's winning streak of 29 when he was 11. By his 5th start at age 12 on April 15, 2019, he had tied winning streak record set by Carty Nagle. An American Pacer who had won 41 consecutive races all the way back in 1938 But he still had one more trotting record to beat. The Swedish cold blooded trotter Järvsöfaks had won 42 straight races at one point in his career. He raced only one week after winning his 41st straight race on April 22 and won his 42nd straight race equalling Järvsöfak's streak. Finally on May 6, 2019, he was entered to try and win his 43rd straight race which would give him the world record for all Harness Racing. He stayed forwardly placed throughout soon taking the lead and keeping his opponents close but never letting them pass him. He'd get one final challenge at the top of the stretch the final time around but he regained his original margin quickly and won the race by a length.

After breaking the record Trebol only continued to extend it the rest of the year. Breaking 50 straight races in late July. As his streak continued the only winnings streaks that were comparable to his were not from Harness horses but Thoroughbreds. With the undefeated Kincsem winning 54 races without a single loss and Camarero a small Puerto Rican racehorse from the 1950s who held the record for Thoroughbreds at 56 consecutive wins. After 3 wins in August and 3 wins in September he had won 55 straight races. Leaving only Camarero's record left. By this time Trebol was used to racing with at-least 20 meters behind his opponents. It didn't seem to matter by this point by the first lap of the race he had passed all his rivals and was leading the field. He kept that lead for the remaining 2 laps of the race and was now tied with Camarero at 56. But just 8 days later he would come home a well beaten third finally snapping the winning streak. He'd return to racing a month later this time coming in second. But only a week later he returned to his winning ways and would conclude the year and his career with 3 straight wins. At the end of the season he had won 23 of 25 races and was retired winning 59 of his last 61 starts.

References 

Racehorses trained in Spain
Standardbred racehorses